Distributed language is a concept in linguistics that language is not an independent symbolic system used by individuals for communication but rather an array of behaviors that constitute human interaction.  The concept of distributed language is based on a biological theory of the origin of language and the concept of distributed cognition.


See also 
 Alexander Kravchenko (linguist)

References

Further reading
 Cowley, Stephen J. (2011). Distributed Language. John Benjamins. .
 Thibault, Paul J. "First-order languaging dynamics and second-order language: The distributed language view." Ecological Psychology 23 (2011): 210–245. 
 Steffensen, Sune Vork. "Distributed language and dialogism: notes on non-locality, sense-making and interactivity." Language Sciences 50 (2015): 105–119. 
 Linell, Per. "Distributed language theory, with or without dialogue." Language Sciences 40 (2013): 168–173. 

Linguistics